The Merry Maidens, also known as Dawn's Men (a likely corruption of the Cornish  Dons Men "Stone Dance") is a late neolithic stone circle located 2 miles (3 km) to the south of the village of St Buryan, in Cornwall, United Kingdom.  A pair of standing stones, The Pipers is associated both geographically and in legend.

Description
The circle, which is thought to be complete, comprises nineteen granite megaliths and is situated in a field alongside the B3315 between Newlyn and Land's End. The stones are approximately 1.2 metres high, with the tallest standing 1.4 metres. They are spaced three to four metres apart with a larger gap between the stones on the east side. The circle is approximately twenty-four metres in diameter. To the south is another stone which suggests a possible north-south orientation. In earlier times there was another stone circle located 200 metres away, but this had been destroyed by the end of the 19th century. 300 metres to the northeast are The Pipers – two 3-metre-high standing stones. These have been described as "largest surviving standing stones in Cornwall and probably the best known". The Tregiffian Burial Chamber is nearby.

Myth and legend

The local myth about the creation of the stones suggests that nineteen maidens were turned into stone as punishment for dancing on a Sunday. (Dans Maen translates as Stone Dance.) The Pipers, two megaliths some distance north-east of the circle, are said to be the petrified remains of the musicians who played for the dancers. A more detailed story explains why the Pipers are so far from the Maidens – apparently the two pipers heard the church clock in St Buryan strike midnight, realised they were breaking the Sabbath, and started to run up the hill away from the maidens who carried on dancing without accompaniment. These petrification legends are often associated with stone circles, as is reflected in the folk names of some of the nearby sites, for example, the Tregeseal Dancing Stones, the Nine Maidens of Boskednan, as well as the more distant Hurlers and Pipers on Bodmin Moor.  Another tradition says that The Pipers were erected to commemorate Howel and Æthelstan, leaders who died in a 10th-century battle.

Research

The Merry Maidens were first examined in detail by antiquarian William Borlase in 1769, who also reported a second equally large circle of stones. In 1872 William Copeland Borlase, a descendant of the elder Borlase, produced a more detailed description of the area. At that time seven stones were still present from the second stone circle, before it disappeared by the end of the 19th century. Hugh O'Neill Hencken wrote a first modern scientific view of the archaeological site in 1932.

A more recent study was produced by John Barnatt in 1982. Today it is thought that there were originally 18 standing stones. In the mid-19th century new stones were added in an attempt at reconstruction, but not in the correct position or number. In addition, some of the old stones were moved, giving the appearance that the stone circle has today.

See also

Other prehistoric stone circles in the Penwith district:
 Boscawen-Un
 Boskednan, also known as the Nine Maidens of Boskednan
 Tregeseal East, also known as the Tregeseal Dancing Stones

Notes

References

External links

 The Merry Maidens stone circle site page on The Megalithic Portal
 The Merry Maidens stone circle site page on The Modern Antiquarian

Penwith
Stone circles in Cornwall